The Y 7100 class of small shunters originally had 210 members. The first 130 were built by Billard, with the remaining 80 by Decauville. They have the 0-4-0 ("B") wheel arrangement, 150 kW diesel engines and hydraulic transmission. They can be found all over the French network.

Y 7192 was converted to mechanical transmission and renumbered as Y 7001. This locomotive was the prototype for the Y7400 class.

Operators
In addition to SNCF, VLFI have purchased four Y 7100 locomotives  (numbers 7172, 7200, 7214 & 7245) from SNCF. two further locos are recorded in use in the Port of Rouen (Grand port maritime de Rouen french).

Some of them are preserved by touristic railroads.

References

External links

Fleet list (SNCF): 

Diesel locomotives of France
B locomotives
Y07100
Railway locomotives introduced in 1958
Standard gauge locomotives of France

Shunting locomotives